
Gmina Kamiennik is a rural gmina (administrative district) in Nysa County, Opole Voivodeship, in south-western Poland.

Villages
Gmina Kamiennik contains the villages and settlements of Białowieża, Chociebórz, Cieszanowice, Goworowice, Kamiennik, Karłowice Małe, Karłowice Wielkie, Kłodobok, Lipniki, Ogonów, Siodłary, Suliszów, Szklary, Tarnów, Wilemowice and Zurzyce.

Neighbouring gminas
Gmina Kamiennik is bordered by the gminas of Grodków, Otmuchów, Pakosławice, Przeworno and Ziębice.

References

Kamiennik
Nysa County